Pare Ko (English: "My Pal") is a song by the Eraserheads. It was included in their debut album, Ultraelectromagneticpop!. It was the band's third hit single. The song was later adapted into a movie of the same title starring Claudine Barreto and Mark Anthony Fernandez. It was covered by APO Hiking Society and later Spongecola.

Controversy
The single and the album was nearly censored by the Philippine Association of the Record Industry (PARI) due to the Tagalog profanity "‘Tang Ina" (Filipino slang whose rough English equivalent is son of a bitch, shortened from 'Putang Ina'). Swear words were unheard of in Philippine music at the time, and as such their record label asked them to record a radio edit of the song; they retitled it "Walang Hiyang Pare Ko", where "Tang Ina" was changed to "'Lang Hiya". It can also be found in Ultraelectromagneticpop! but not in the remastered 25th anniversary version.

Covers
APO Hiking Society covered the song in 2001 for their final studio album Banda Rito
Sponge Cola also covered the song for the 2005 compilation album Ultraelectromagneticjam!: The Music of the Eraserheads
Johnoy Danao covered the song once again for the 2012 compilation album The Reunion: An Eraserheads Tribute Album
Rivermaya lead vocalist from 2007-2011 Jason Fernandez covered the song as a Wishclusive on Wish 107.5 last 2018.

In popular culture
The song was adapted into a Star Cinema movie in 1994 starring Claudine Barretto, Gwapings members Mark Anthony Fernandez and Jomari Yllana along with Jao Mapa, Victor Neri and Gio Alvarez.

On the June 2, 2019, episode of Kapuso Mo, Jessica Soho, this was played as the background music.

References

Eraserheads songs
1993 songs
1993 singles
Obscenity controversies in music
Songs written by Ely Buendia
Tagalog-language songs